Suntok sa Buwan is a 2022 Philippine television sports drama series broadcast by TV5. Directed by Geo Lomuntad, it stars Aga Muhlach and Elijah Canlas. It premiered on July 18, 2022 on the network's Todo Max Primetime Singko line up, replacing Dear God. The series concluded on December 8, 2022 with a total of 65 episodes.

Plot
Jimmy Boy (Muhlach), a retired boxer who currently works as a taxi driver, has Stage 3 cancer. This diagnosis deeply affects his son, Dos (Canlas), who dreams of becoming a professional boxer like his father. The two will face conflicts and life-challenging experiences that would lead one of them to make sacrifices and strengthen their bond as father and son.

Cast and characters
Main cast
 Aga Muhlach as Jimmy Boy
 Elijah Canlas as Dos

Supporting cast
 Maris Racal as Trina
 Matet de Leon as Nesthy
 Albie Casiño as Pistol
 Rez Cortez as Magnum / Migs
 Awra Briguela as Orange
 Paulo Angeles as Barok
 Bianca Manalo as Andrea

Production
The series marks Aga Muhlach's first series in a decade since M3: Malay Mo Ma-develop in 2010. He stated that he would accept an offer as long as it takes place in Baguio.

This series had a 5-night special on September 12 to 16.

Episodes

References

External links
 

2022 Philippine television series debuts
2022 Philippine television series endings
2020s Philippine television series
TV5 (Philippine TV network) drama series
Filipino-language television shows
Philippine sports television series